Herbert or Herb Ball may refer to:

Herb Ball (1918–2000), American professional basketball player
Herbert Henry Ball (1863–1943), Canadian politician and journalist